The 1987 season was the Chicago Bears' 68th in the National Football League the 18th post-season completed in the NFL, and their sixth under head coach Mike Ditka. The team was looking to return to the playoffs, win the NFC Central Division for the fourth consecutive year and avenge their loss in the Divisional Playoffs to the Washington Redskins the year before when the team finished 14–2.

However, the Bears failed to improve on their 14–2 record from 1986, with the team finishing at 11–4 in the strike-shortened season. Their record was once again good enough for the division title and the #2 seed in the conference, as the team had done the year before. The team also saw the same result as 1986 as the Bears suffered a second consecutive loss to the Redskins, who went on to win Super Bowl XXII, in the Divisional Playoffs.

Offseason

1987 Chicago Bears draft choices

Undrafted free agents

A frustrating season
The 1987 season proved to be a frustrating one for not only the Bears, but probably for most associating with professional football. The league endured its second strike-shortened season in the last 6 seasons, and this was a strike that truly divided teams, including Chicago.

In the windy city, the strike divided its players and tarnished its coach, and the season would be the last for greats such as Walter Payton, Gary Fencik (both of whom retired), Willie Gault (dealt to the Raiders), Wilber Marshall (signed as a free agent by the Redskins), and for all intents and purposes, Otis Wilson.

The makings of the 1987 strike
1987 started with the usual drama in Platteville-everyone wondering if Jim McMahon would play at all during the year, McMahon openly feuded with coach Mike Ditka, upset over the new signal-caller Jim Harbaugh that the team picked in the first round. Tension was also building due to strike talk that loomed- always a bad omen for a team.

First up for Chicago in 1987 was a matchup with the defending world champion New York Giants. As if this game wasn't tough enough in and of itself, it would be played on Monday Night Football, and the Bears would be led by 3rd-year QB Mike Tomczak. McMahon and Steve Fuller were injured, Doug Flutie was traded, and rookie Jim Harbaugh needed to be groomed for a few years before he would be ready. The Bears pulled it out in their typical fashion, however, trouncing the world champs by a score of 34–19 behind a remarkable performance by Tomczak who completed 20 of 34 passes for 292 yards. Dennis McKinnon delighted the Soldier Field crowd that night by returning a punt 94 yards for a touchdown, it was the longest TD Punt return in the NFL in 1987. The Bears, it appeared were back. The club won their second game against the Tampa Bay Buccaneers on September 20, then the strike of 1987 was called, forcing the cancellation of all NFL games the week of September 27.

Scabs
During the first days of the strike, the league pondered what to do, as most teams' players were deeply divided over whether to strike or not. This was not 1982, everyone learned, as the league decided to hire replacement players (referred to as "scabs" and "spare Bears"), as cancelling half the season was not an option. 

Mike Ditka decided to make his feelings public about the strike, as he fully backed management on the work-stoppage. He referred to the spare players as his "real" players, a move which angered the true Bears out on strike and forced the team to spend the night in Philadelphia’s Veterans Stadium before their first game, to avoid crossing the pickets. This turned out to be a wound not healed easily or quickly in the months to come. 

Defensive end Steve Trimble was the last Bear to wear #40 as the number was later retired in honor of Gale Sayers. 

The scabs held their foes to 29 points in three games, and posted a 2-1 record.

Chicago Spare Bears
After the league decided to use replacement players during the NFLPA strike, the following team was assembled, and was given the name "Spare Bears" by the Chicago Tribune's writer Don Pierson. The players were also known as "The Impostors of the Midway", "Bearlys" and "Chicago Bares". No regular players crossed during the strike.

Notable scabs

 Sean Payton (quarterback) – coached the New Orleans Saints to victory in Super Bowl XLIV.
 Tommy Barnhardt (punter) – had a 14-year career with several teams.
 Mark Rodenhauser (center / long snapper) - kept on the team as a long snapper for the 1987 season. Had a 12-year career with seven teams.
 Lorenzo Lynch (defensive back) – had an 11-year career with 17 career interceptions.
 John Wojciechowski (offensive lineman) – had a 7-year career solely with the Bears.
 Glen Kozlowski (wide receiver/special teams) – had a 6-year career solely with the Bears.
 Mike Hohensee (quarterback) – coached the Chicago Rush to the ArenaBowl XX championship.
 Mike Stoops (safety) – former Arizona Wildcats head coach (2004-2011) and former defensive coordinator for the Oklahoma Sooners.

After the strike
The strike turned out to only last four weeks, encompassing three games, and the Bears went 2–1. The teams that hired the best replacement players did themselves a favor in the end, a group of which the Bears were a part of. When the "real" 1987 resumed, Jim McMahon was back at QB, and the Bears pulled off their biggest come-from-behind win in history, beating Tampa 27–26 after trailing 20–0. The victory proved to be inspiring, as they then won the next two games, including a 26–24 victory over the Green Bay Packers at Lambeau Field. In this game, Chicago trailed with less than a minute left, when McMahon led the team down the field for a game-winning 55-yard field goal off the leg of Kevin Butler. After the kick, Butler turned and "flipped the bird" to Packer coach Forrest Gregg, in effect saying "see you later" to the coach who was finally axed after the 1987 NFL season.

After the inspiring Green Bay win, Chicago lost a close game at Mile High Stadium to the Denver Broncos 31–29 on Monday Night Football, then beat Green Bay at home and Minnesota on the road, in the infamous "Rollerdome" game (Mike Ditka referred to the Hubert H. Humphrey Metrodome by this name, prompting the Vikings' cheerleaders to parade around on skates throughout the contest.) The Bears were 10–2 with three games left, but dropped 2 of them, and struggled into the playoffs. One of those losses was a 41–0 disaster at San Francisco at the hands of the San Francisco 49ers, and Mike Ditka threw his gum at a heckling fan, prompting assault charges to be filed against him.

Postseason
The Bears lost 21–17 to the Washington Redskins in the divisional playoffs. They took a 14–0 lead, but the Redskins rallied behind quarterback Doug Williams to win a playoff game in Soldier Field for the second straight season.

Final roster

Regular season

Schedule

Game summaries

Week 1

Week 15

Standings

Postseason

References

External links

 1987 Chicago Bears Season at www.bearshistory.com

Chicago Bears
Chicago Bears seasons
NFC Central championship seasons
Chicago